In algebra, casus irreducibilis (Latin for "the irreducible case") is one of the cases that may arise in solving polynomials of degree 3 or higher with integer coefficients algebraically (as opposed to numerically), i.e., by obtaining roots that are expressed with radicals. It shows that many algebraic numbers are real-valued but cannot be expressed in radicals without introducing complex numbers. The most notable occurrence of casus irreducibilis is in the case of cubic polynomials that have three real roots, which was proven by Pierre Wantzel in 1843.
One can see whether a given cubic polynomial is in so-called casus irreducibilis by looking at the discriminant, via Cardano's formula.

The three cases of the discriminant 
Let
 
Then the discriminant is given by
 
It appears in the algebraic solution and is the square of the product
 
of the  differences of the 3 roots .

 If , then the polynomial has one real root and two complex non-real roots.  is purely imaginary.Although there are cubic polynomials with negative discriminant which are irreducible in the modern sense, casus irreducibilis does not apply.
 If , then  and there are three real roots; two of them are equal. Whether  can be found out by the Euclidean algorithm, and if so, the roots by the quadratic formula. Moreover, all roots are real and expressible by real radicals.All the cubic polynomials with zero discriminant are reducible.
 If , then  is non-zero and real, and there are three distinct real roots which are sums of two complex conjugates.Because they require complex numbers (in the understanding of the time: cube roots from non-real numbers, i.e. from square roots from negative numbers) to express them in radicals, this case in the 16th century has been termed casus irreducibilis.

Formal statement and proof 

To prove this, note that the discriminant  is positive. Form the field extension . Suppose that  can be solved by real radicals. Then  can be split by a tower of cyclic extensions

However, there are no primitive 3rd roots of unity in a real closed field. Suppose that ω is a primitive 3rd root of unity. Then, by the axioms defining an ordered field, ω and ω2 are both positive, because otherwise their cube (=1) would be negative. But if ω2>ω, then cubing both sides gives 1>1, a contradiction; similarly if ω>ω2.

Solution in non-real radicals

Cardano's solution 

Then  regardless of the number of real roots, by Cardano's solution the three roots are given by

Here if the radicands under the cube roots are non-real, the cube roots expressed by radicals are defined to be any pair of complex conjugate cube roots, while if they are real these cube roots are defined to be the real cube roots.

Even in the reducible case in which one of three real roots is rational and hence can be factored out by polynomial long division, Cardano's formula (unnecessarily in this case) expresses that root (and the others) in terms of non-real radicals.

Example 
The cubic equation

is irreducible, because if it could be factored there would be a linear factor giving a rational solution, while none of the possible roots given by the rational root test are actually roots. Since its discriminant is positive, it has three real roots, so it is an example of casus irreducibilis. These roots can be expressed as

The solutions are in radicals and involve the cube roots of complex conjugate numbers.

Trigonometric solution in terms of real quantities 

While casus irreducibilis cannot be solved in radicals in terms of real quantities, it can be solved trigonometrically in terms of real quantities. Specifically, the depressed monic cubic equation  is solved by

These solutions are in terms of real quantities if and only if  — i.e., if and only if there are three real roots. The formula involves starting with an angle whose cosine is known, trisecting the angle by multiplying it by 1/3, and taking the cosine of the resulting angle and adjusting for scale.

Although cosine and its inverse function (arccosine) are transcendental functions, this solution is algebraic in the sense that  is an algebraic function, equivalent to angle trisection.

Relation to angle trisection
The distinction between the reducible and irreducible cubic cases with three real roots is related to the issue of whether or not an angle is trisectible by the classical means of compass and unmarked straightedge. For any angle , one-third of this angle has a cosine that is one of the three solutions to

Likewise,  has a sine that is one of the three real solutions to

As an example, while a 180° angle can be trisected into three 60° angles, a 60° angle cannot be trisected with only compass and straightedge. Using triple-angle formulae one can see that  where . Rearranging gives , which fails the rational root test as none of the rational numbers suggested by the theorem is actually a root. Therefore, the minimal polynomial of  has degree 3, whereas the degree of the minimal polynomial of any constructible number must be a power of two.

Expressing  in radicals results in

which involves taking the cube root of complex numbers.

The connection between rational roots and trisectability can also be extended to some cases where the sine and cosine of the given angle is irrational. Consider as an example the case where the given angle  is a vertex angle of a regular pentagon, a polygon that can be constructed classically. For this angle  is 180°, and standard trigonometric identities then give

thus

The cosine of the trisected angle is rendered as a rational expression in terms of the cosine of the given angle, so the vertex angle of a regular pentagon can be trisected (mechanically, by simply drawing a diagonal).

Generalization 
Casus irreducibilis can be generalized to higher degree polynomials as follows.

Thus for any irreducible polynomial whose degree is not a power of 2 and which has all roots real, no root can be expressed purely in terms of real radicals, i.e. it is a casus irreducibilis in the (16th century) sense of this article. Moreover, if the polynomial degree is a power of 2 and the roots are all real, then if there is a root that can be expressed in real radicals it can be expressed in terms of square roots and no higher-degree roots, as can the other roots, and so the roots are classically constructible.

Casus irreducibilis for quintic polynomials is discussed by Dummit.

Relation to angle pentasection (quintisection) and higher 
The distinction between the reducible and irreducible quintic cases with five real roots is related to the issue of whether or not an angle with rational cosine or rational sine is pentasectible (able to be split into five equal parts) by the classical means of compass and unmarked straightedge. For any angle , one-fifth of this angle has a cosine that is one of the five real roots of the equation

Likewise,  has a sine that is one of the five real roots of the equation

In either case, if the rational root test yields a rational root x1, then the quintic is reducible since it can be written as a factor (x—x1) times a quartic polynomial. An example of this is when one attempts to construct a 25-gon (icosipentagon) with compass and straightedge. While a pentagon is relatively easy to construct, a 25-gon requires an angle pentasector as the minimal polynomial for  has degree 10:

Thus,

Notes

References 
 . See in particular Section 1.3 Cubic Equations over the Real Numbers (pp. 15–22) and Section 8.6 The Casus Irreducibilis (pp. 220–227).

External links 

Polynomials
Algebra